The Air Force Monument is an outdoor memorial and sculpture by Leonard McMurry, installed in Oklahoma City, in the U.S. state of Oklahoma.

Description and history

The  monument was completed in 1964, then restored in 2002 and rededicated in 2003. It depicts a man holding the United States Air Force seal and an eagle above his head. The memorial is dedicated "to the memory of those Oklahomans who have given their lives while serving their country as members of the United States Air Force and for the working men and women at Tinker Air Force Base, both military and civilian, who have and continue to give of themselves for the defense of the homeland we so dearly love".

See also
 1964 in art

References

External links

 Air Force Monument at Emporis

1964 establishments in Oklahoma
1964 sculptures
Air Force monuments and memorials
Maps in art
Military monuments and memorials in the United States
Monuments and memorials in Oklahoma
Outdoor sculptures in Oklahoma City
Sculptures of birds in the United States
Sculptures of men in Oklahoma
Statues in Oklahoma
United States Air Force